John Paul Polich (July 8, 1915 – May 27, 2001) was an American professional ice hockey player who played three games in the National Hockey League with the New York Rangers during the 1939–40 and 1940–41 seasons. The rest of his career, which lasted from 1939 to 1948, was spent in the minor leagues.

Career statistics

Regular season and playoffs

External links

1915 births
2001 deaths
American men's ice hockey right wingers
Ice hockey players from Minnesota
Los Angeles Monarchs players
New York Rangers players
Philadelphia Ramblers players
Sportspeople from Hibbing, Minnesota